Meaghan Elizabeth Nally (born June 30, 1998) is an American professional soccer player who plays as a defender for National Women's Soccer League club Portland Thorns.

Career
Born in Fairfax, Virginia, Nally began her career at FC Virginia where she played from 2008 to 2016, before she began playing college soccer for the Georgetown Hoyas. During her first season, she appeared in 21 games, starting once against the USC Trojans in the 2016 Women's College Cup. The next season, she started 20 games for the Hoyas, scoring 3 goals, before appearing in all 25 games for her college in 2018.

Portland Thorns
On January 16, 2020, Nally was selected with the 25th overall pick in the NWSL College Draft by the Portland Thorns. After not appearing for the Thorns in the NWSL Challenge Cup, Nally was loaned out to German Frauen-Bundesliga club Turbine Potsdam. She played 9 matches while in Germany, helping her side keep four cleansheets.

In 2021, Nally returned from her loan and made her professional debut for the Thorns on April 15, 2021, against the Chicago Red Stars in the Challenge Cup. She came on as an 83rd-minute substitute in the 1–0 victory.

Career statistics

Honors 
Portland Thorns FC

 NWSL Championship: 2022

References

External links
 Profile at Portland Thorns

1998 births
Living people
Sportspeople from Fairfax, Virginia
American women's soccer players
Women's association football defenders
Georgetown Hoyas women's soccer players
1. FFC Turbine Potsdam players
Portland Thorns FC players
Frauen-Bundesliga players
National Women's Soccer League players
Soccer players from Virginia
American expatriate women's soccer players
Expatriate footballers in Germany
Portland Thorns FC draft picks